Lakeville may refer to:

Canada
Lakeville, a local service district north of Woodstock, New Brunswick
Lakeville, Carleton County, New Brunswick, a community within the local service district
Lakeville, Westmorland County, New Brunswick, a community near Moncton
Lakeville, Nova Scotia

United States
Lakeville, California
Cartago, California, formerly Lakeville, California
Lakeville, Connecticut
Lakeville, Indiana
Lakeville, Maine
Lakeville, Massachusetts
Lakeville, Minnesota
Lakeville, Ohio